Ocnița is a village in the Camenca District of Transnistria, Moldova. It has since 1990 been administered as a part of the breakaway Pridnestrovian Moldavian Republic.

References

Villages of Transnistria
Camenca District